Salvador Brau y Asencio (January 11, 1842 – November 5, 1912) was a Puerto Rican journalist, poet, dramatist, novelist, historian, and sociologist. He was designated the official historian of Puerto Rico by the first American-appointed governor of the island.

Early years
Brau was born in Cabo Rojo, Puerto Rico into a well-to-do family. His father was Bartolomé Brau, a Catalan teacher, and his mother was Luisa Asencio, a native of Venezuela. Brau received his primary and secondary education in private schools. Forced to work to care for his family after the death of his father in about 1855, he began to teach himself. By the age of 16, he was composing various literary works and with his friends started a theatrical society. He wished to continue his education in an institute of higher learning and thus went to Spain in 1861 where he attended the University of Barcelona, earning a degree in Letters. During his stay in the mother country, he came into contact with the autonomist movement of Puerto Rico and became involved. Eventually, Brau earned his Doctorate in Letters.

Important discoveries

In 1870, Brau returned to Puerto Rico and became a journalist.  He joined the Autonomist Party of Puerto Rico and became politically active, believing that Puerto Rico should be granted more powers by the Spanish Crown. He expressed his beliefs in his novels and plays, including one of his most acclaimed plays, "La Vuelta al Hogar" (Once on This Island).

In 1894, Brau was named Commissioner for the Provincial Deputation.  He then moved back to Spain where he investigated the historical documents pertaining to Puerto Rico's past.  These documents were stored and continue to be stored in the Indias Archives of Seville. In 1897, after three years of investigating the historical documents, Brau returned to Puerto Rico.

His findings in Seville included documents written by Fray Antonio de Montesinos, Fray Íñigo Abad y Lasierra and others. He uncovered important information about how the Taínos lived and how they were treated harshly by the Spanish settlers. During his investigation he found an interesting reference to the Puerto Rican danza. According to a document written by Fray Íñigo Abad y Lasierra, Bishop of Puerto Rico (1772–1778), there was a typical, fast and noisy shoe-stomping dance in the island which he called "Puerto Rican danza". Brau, however, claims that the authentic Puerto Rican danza was a popular creation that emerged in the 19th century.

Official Historian of Puerto Rico
In 1898, Puerto Rico became a colonial possession of the United States after the Spanish–American War in accordance with the Treaty of Paris. Brau continued to be politically active and in 1903 was named Official Historian of Puerto Rico by the American-appointed governor William Henry Hunt. He held this position until his death on November 5, 1912 in San Juan, Puerto Rico. He was interred  in Santa María Magdalena de Pazzis Cemetery in Old San Juan.

Written works
A partial list of Brau's written works:
1892 - Puerto Rico y su historia [Puerto Rico and its history] (Puerto Rico: Tip. de Arturo Cordova)
1904 - Historia de Puerto Rico [History of Puerto Rico] (New York: D. Appleton & Co.)
1907 - La Colonizacion de Puerto Rico [The Colonization of Puerto Rico] (San Juan: Tip. del “Heraldo Español”)
1909 - La fundación de Ponce: estudio retrospectivo que comprende desde los asomos de vecindad europea en las riberas del Portugués, al terminar el siglo XVI, hasta el incendio casi total del pueblo de Ponce en febrero de 1820. (Ponce: Tipografia "La Democracia")
¿Pecadora? (a novel)

Legacy

The town of San Juan honored him with a park and a statue. The town of Cabo Rojo has honored his memory with a monument and by naming a hall in its amphitheater after him. The town of Aguada has a bust of Brau in its plaza. Brau was one of the few Puerto Ricans to be honored by the United States Maritime Commission when during World War II the Liberty ship  was built in Panama City, Florida, and named in his honor.

See also

List of Puerto Ricans
German immigration to Puerto Rico

Notes

References

External links
 El Nuevo Dia
 
 

1842 births
1912 deaths
People from Cabo Rojo, Puerto Rico
University of Barcelona alumni
Puerto Rican people of Catalan descent
Puerto Rican people of German descent
Puerto Rican people of Venezuelan descent
19th-century Puerto Rican historians
Burials at Santa María Magdalena de Pazzis Cemetery
Historians of Puerto Rico
Puerto Rican expatriates in Spain
20th-century Puerto Rican historians